Matthias Wörndle (7 December 1909 – 15 October 1942) was a German cross-country skier.

Wörndle was born in Partenkirchen, where he was member of the Skiclub Partenkirchen (SCP)

He was member of the Bronze teams at the first and second edition of the legendary Trofeo Mezzalama race, in 1933 together with Willy Bogner and Gustav "Gustl" Müller, and in 1934 together with Franz Fischer and Gustl Müller.

At the 1936 Winter Olympics he finished 24th in the 50 km event.

Wörndle died in the Pshish River in the Soviet Union, when he served in the army during World War II.

References 

1909 births
1942 deaths
German male cross-country skiers
Olympic cross-country skiers of Germany
Cross-country skiers at the 1936 Winter Olympics
German male ski mountaineers
Sportspeople from Garmisch-Partenkirchen
German Army personnel killed in World War II
People from the Kingdom of Bavaria
German Army personnel of World War II
20th-century German people
Military personnel from Bavaria